Donaghcloney Mill Cricket Club is a cricket club in Donaghcloney, County Down, Northern Ireland, playing in Section 1 of the NCU Senior League.

It was formed in 2017, when Donacloney Cricket Club and the club merged with Millpark Cricket Club merged and adopted the name Donaghcloney Mill.

Donacloney had been founded by the Liddell family, proprietors of the William Liddell & Co. factory in the village of Donaghcloney. The Liddells were members of the North of Ireland Cricket Club in Belfast and decided to establish a club in Donaghcloney for the recreation of the factory workers.

References

External links
Donaghcloney Cricket Club

Cricket clubs in County Down
NCU Senior League members
Cricket clubs in Northern Ireland